De Humani Corporis Fabrica is a French-Swiss documentary film, directed by Lucien Castaing-Taylor and Véréna Paravel and released in 2022. Named after De Humani Corporis Fabrica Libri Septem, a 16th-century book series that was one of the most influential advances in the study of human anatomy, the film explores the human body through depictions of surgeries and autopsies in multiple hospitals around Paris, including intimate close-up footage from inside human bodies. 

The film premiered in the Directors' Fortnight program at the 2022 Cannes Film Festival. It was also screened in the Wavelengths program at the 2022 Toronto International Film Festival, and in the main slate of the 2022 New York Film Festival.

References

External links

2022 films
2022 documentary films
French documentary films
Swiss documentary films
Documentary films about the human body
2020s French films